In mathematics, more particularly in the fields of dynamical systems and geometric topology, an Anosov map on a manifold M is a certain type of mapping, from M to itself, with rather clearly marked local directions of "expansion" and "contraction". Anosov systems are a special case of Axiom A systems.

Anosov diffeomorphisms were introduced by Dmitri Victorovich Anosov, who proved that their behaviour was in an appropriate sense generic (when they exist at all).

Overview 
Three closely related definitions must be distinguished:
 If a differentiable map f on M has a hyperbolic structure on the tangent bundle, then it is called an Anosov map.  Examples include the Bernoulli map, and Arnold's cat map.
 If the map is a diffeomorphism, then it is called an Anosov diffeomorphism.
 If a flow on a manifold splits the tangent bundle into three invariant subbundles, with one subbundle that is exponentially contracting, and one that is exponentially expanding, and a third, non-expanding, non-contracting one-dimensional sub-bundle (spanned by the flow direction), then the flow is called an Anosov flow.

A classical example of Anosov diffeomorphism is the Arnold's cat map.

Anosov proved that Anosov diffeomorphisms are structurally stable and form an open subset of mappings (flows) with the C1 topology.

Not every manifold admits an Anosov diffeomorphism; for example, there are no such diffeomorphisms on the sphere . The simplest examples of compact manifolds admitting them are the tori: they admit the so-called linear Anosov diffeomorphisms, which are isomorphisms having no eigenvalue of modulus 1. It was proved that any other Anosov diffeomorphism on a torus is topologically conjugate to one of this kind.

The problem of classifying manifolds that admit Anosov diffeomorphisms turned out to be very difficult, and still  has no answer. The only known examples are infranil manifolds, and it is conjectured that they are the only ones.

A sufficient condition for transitivity is that all points are nonwandering: .

Also, it is unknown if every  volume-preserving Anosov diffeomorphism is ergodic. Anosov proved it under a  assumption. It is also true for  volume-preserving Anosov diffeomorphisms.

For  transitive Anosov diffeomorphism  there exists a unique SRB measure (the acronym stands for Sinai, Ruelle and Bowen)  supported on  such that its basin  is of full volume, where

Anosov flow on (tangent bundles of) Riemann surfaces
As an example, this section develops the case of the Anosov flow on the tangent bundle of a Riemann surface of negative curvature. This flow can be understood in terms of the flow on the tangent bundle of the Poincaré half-plane model of hyperbolic geometry. Riemann surfaces of negative curvature may be defined as Fuchsian models, that is, as the quotients of the upper half-plane and a Fuchsian group. For the following, let H be the upper half-plane; let Γ be a Fuchsian group; let M = H/Γ be a Riemann surface of negative curvature as the quotient of "M" by the action of the group Γ, and let  be the tangent bundle of unit-length vectors on the manifold M, and let  be the tangent bundle of unit-length vectors on H. Note that a bundle of unit-length vectors on a surface is the principal bundle of  a complex line bundle.

Lie vector fields
One starts by noting that  is isomorphic to the Lie group PSL(2,R). This group is the group of orientation-preserving isometries of the upper half-plane. The Lie algebra of PSL(2,R) is sl(2,R), and is represented by the matrices

which have the algebra

The exponential maps

These are just the standard, ordinary Lie vector fields on the manifold of a Lie group, and the presentation above is a standard exposition of a Lie vector field.

Anosov flow
The connection to the Anosov flow comes from the realization that  is the geodesic flow on P and Q. Lie vector fields being (by definition) left invariant under the action of a group element, one has that these fields are left invariant under the specific elements  of the geodesic flow. In other words, the spaces TP and TQ are split into three one-dimensional spaces, or subbundles, each of which are invariant under the geodesic flow.  The final step is to notice that vector fields in one subbundle expand (and expand exponentially), those in another are unchanged, and those in a third shrink (and do so exponentially).

More precisely, the tangent bundle TQ may be written as the direct sum 

or, at a point , the direct sum

corresponding to the Lie algebra generators Y, J and X, respectively, carried, by the left action of group element g, from the origin e to the point q. These spaces are each subbundles, and are preserved (are invariant) under the action of the  geodesic flow; that is, under the action of group elements .

This may be seen by examining how the group elements commute. The geodesic flow is invariant,

but the other two shrink and expand:

and 

Geometric interpretation of the Anosov flow
When acting on the point  of the upper half-plane,  corresponds to a geodesic on the upper half plane, passing through the point . The action is the standard Möbius transformation action of SL(2,R) on the upper half-plane, so that 

A general geodesic is given by

Horocycles correspond to the motion of the normal vectors of a horosphere on the upper half-plane.

See also 
 Ergodic flow
 Morse–Smale system
 Pseudo-Anosov map

Notes

References 
 
 Anthony Manning, Dynamics of geodesic and horocycle flows on surfaces of constant negative curvature, (1991), appearing as Chapter 3 in Ergodic Theory, Symbolic Dynamics and Hyperbolic Spaces, Tim Bedford, Michael Keane and Caroline Series, Eds. Oxford University Press, Oxford (1991).  (Provides an expository introduction to the Anosov flow on SL(2,R).)

 Toshikazu Sunada, Magnetic flows on a Riemann surface, Proc. KAIST Math. Workshop (1993), 93–108.

Diffeomorphisms
Dynamical systems
Hyperbolic geometry